The rufous-throated honeyeater (Conopophila rufogularis) is a species of bird in the family Meliphagidae.
It is endemic to northern Australia.

Its natural habitat is subtropical or tropical mangrove forests.

References

rufous-throated honeyeater
Birds of the Northern Territory
Birds of Queensland
Endemic birds of Australia
rufous-throated honeyeater
Taxonomy articles created by Polbot